The Chris Jensen Round Barn was a historic round barn located at 11723 West Galena Road near Lena, Illinois. The barn's livestock stalls were arranged in parallel rows; this configuration was highly unusual among round barns, which typically featured wedge-shaped stalls arranged along the outer circle of the barn.

The barn was listed on the National Register of Historic Places on February 23, 1984. It has since been demolished, though it is still on the Register.

References

Barns on the National Register of Historic Places in Illinois
Buildings and structures in Stephenson County, Illinois
Round barns in Illinois
National Register of Historic Places in Stephenson County, Illinois